Julio César Frade Pintos, better known as Julio Frade (born 31 January 1943 in Montevideo) is a Uruguayan pianist, actor, comedian and radio host.

As a student, Frade spent a year as an exchange student in the United States with AFS Intercultural Programs, studying piano at Berklee College.

In the 1960s he started a long television career by joining in a well-known group of other Uruguayan comedians (Ricardo Espalter, Eduardo D'Angelo, Enrique Almada, Raimundo Soto), he was also part of several successful humor TV shows such as : Telecataplúm (1962), Jaujarana (1969-1972), Comicolor (1981-1984), Híperhumor (1984-1989), Decalegrón (1977-2002). Since 2021, he has been part of the television contest team, Los 8 escalones, broadcast on Channel 4.

He became also renowned for his music, playing alongside Astor Piazzolla and other famous musicians.

References

External links
 

1943 births
People from Montevideo
Berklee College of Music alumni
Uruguayan pianists
Male pianists
Uruguayan male musicians
20th-century Uruguayan male actors
Uruguayan male comedians
Uruguayan radio personalities
Living people
21st-century Uruguayan male actors
Male actors from Montevideo
Uruguayan male television actors
Uruguayan radio presenters
21st-century pianists
21st-century male musicians